Los Yébenes is a municipality located in the province of Toledo, Castile-La Mancha, Spain. According to the 2006 census (INE), the municipality has a population of 6,341 inhabitants.

See also
Battle of Yevenes (1809)

References

Municipalities in the Province of Toledo